Dianosuchus is an extinct genus of protosuchid crocodylomorph. Fossils have been found from the Dark Red Beds of the Lower Lufeng Formation in Yunnan, China, dating back to the Sinemurian stage of the Early Jurassic. It is characterized by an unusually flattened snout compared to other protosuchians, conical isodont teeth that lacked striations, and very small antorbital fenestrae.

References

Early Jurassic crocodylomorphs
Terrestrial crocodylomorphs
Early Jurassic reptiles of Asia
Prehistoric pseudosuchian genera
Fossil taxa described in 1982